Ricardo "Rick" Bonadio (born June 21, 1969) is a Brazilian music producer, songwriter, multi-instrumentalist and sound engineer, owner of Midas Studio and record companies Arsenal Music and Midas Music.

Career
He began his career in the 80's as a musician, arranger and then opened a small Bonadio Produções studio. In 1989, he partnered with Nando, where they made a pair of RAP, Rick & Nando, released a vinyl record in 1989, it was considered one of the first rap albums in Brazil. In the 90's he began to excel at working with Christian rock musicians such as the band Katsbarnea and their lead singer, Brother Simion. In 1991, he worked as a keyboardist and sound engineer on the album Vida, Jesus & Rock'n'Roll, from the band Resgate. At this time, it was for the first time producer in the Brother disc, of Brother Simion, whose disc was considered, by several historians, musicians and journalists, like the 41º greater album of Brazilian Christian music, in a publication. It was the producer who discovered produced and hosted the phenomenon Mamonas Assassinas later, and since then has become one of the most requested musical producers in Brazil. With the band, Bonadio received the nickname of Creuzebek. The musician also, for several years, worked in partnership with producers Paulo Anhaia and Rodrigo Castanho.

Shortly thereafter he released and produced the band Charlie Brown Jr. and continued working in his studio and in Multinational of music in Brazil.

In addition to music producer and composer, he was also a juror for the Popstars program at SBT, which was shown in two seasons. In the first one, shown in 2002, the female pop band Rouge was formed. The band was extinguished at the end of 2005. The second season, released in 2003, revealed the male pop band Br'oZ. Still on television, he is a musical producer on Olha a Minha Banda, from Caldeirão do Huck, shown by Rede Globo, where beginner bands are helped by the painting to reach stardom. Between 1998 and 2002, Bonadio was general and artistic director of the Brazilian division of the record company Virgin Records, whose Brazilian operation was later absorbed by EMI Music. In 2001, shortly before leaving office, he created the record label and producer Arsenal Music, responsible for bands such as Fresno, NX Zero, Tihuana, CPM 22 and Hateen, among others. The label's catalog was distributed by Sony Music between 2001 and 2005, when the operation was taken over by Universal Music.

In 2011, he was jury of the Ídolos program, Rede Record, with Luiza Possi and Marco Camargo. In 2012 it definitely sells Arsenal Music to Universal Music, transferring the artists there and ending the label. In the same year he created his own new label, Midas Music. In 2013 the musical reality show Fábrica de Estrellas premiered at the Multishow that showed the day of the producer, his work with great artists and also a dispute between new singers for the formation of a girlband. The Girls group. He was jury of Ídolos 2011, next to Luiza Possi and Marco Camargo.

He is currently the jury and producer of the Brazilian version of the X Factor program and general director of Midas Music and Studio Midas, one of the largest studios in Latin America.

Personal life
Son of a seamstress and an auto parts store owner, Rick was married to Suseth Marcellon, with whom he has two children, Gabriela and Leonardo. He is currently married to the choreographer Paula Peixoto Bonadio.

Productions

Albums

1989 : Rick e Nando - Rick e Nando 
1991: Vida, Jesus & Rock'n'Roll - Resgate 
1992: Brother - Brother Simion 
1992: Cristo ou Barrabás - Katsbarnea
1993: Novos Rumos - Resgate
1994: Esperança - Brother Simion 
1995: Mamonas Assassinas - Mamonas Assassinas 
1997: Transpiração Contínua Prolongada - Charlie Brown Jr. 
1998: Atenção, Creuzebek: a Baixaria Continua! - Mamonas Assassinas 
1998: Rodolfo & ET - ET & Rodolfo
1999: Preço Curto... Prazo Longo - Charlie Brown Jr. 
1999: Los Hermanos - Los Hermanos 
2000: Praise - Resgate 
2000: Todo Mundo Doido - O Surto
2002: Rouge - Rouge 
2002: Rouge Remixes - Rouge 
2002: Eu Sou Assim - Luiza Possi 
2002: Eu Continuo de Pé - Resgate 
2003: C'est La Vie - Rouge 
2003: Br'oz - Br'oz 
2003: Aqui ou em Qualquer Lugar - Tihuana 
2003: Tudo Outra Vez - LS Jack 
2004: Pro Mundo Levar - Luiza Possi 
2004: Segundo Ato - Br'oz 
2004: Blá Blá Blá - Rouge 
2004: Acústico MTV - Ira! 
2004: Iara Negrete Canta Divas - Acústico - Iara Negrete 
2004: Tamo Aí na Atividade - Charlie Brown Jr. 
2005: Imunidade Musical - Charlie Brown Jr. 
2005: Tihuana - Tihuana 
2005: Mil e Uma Noites - Rouge 
2006: Cidade Cinza - CPM 22 
2006: NX Zero - NX Zero 
2006: Rastaclone - Rastaclone 

2006: Vou Tirar Você Desse Lugar: Tributo a Odair José - Many artists
2006: Procedimentos de Emergência - Hateen
2006: Um Dia de Cada Vez - Tihuana 
2006: Vicious - Supla 
2006: Eu Sou 300 - Sérgio Britto 
2007: MTV ao Vivo - 5 Bandas de Rock - Many artists 
2007: Invisível DJ - Ira! 
2007: Country Star - Nathalia Siqueira
2008: Redenção - Fresno 
2008: Agora - NX Zero 
2008: Ao Vivo - Nathalia Siqueira 
2008: O que se Leva da Vida, é a Vida que se Leva - Tulio Dek 
2009: Gloria - Gloria 
2009: One: 16 Hits - Mamonas Assassinas 
2009: Sete Chaves - NX Zero 
2009: Sacos Plásticos - Titãs 
2009: Camisa 10 Joga Bola Até na Chuva - Charlie Brown Jr. 
2010: Hiperativo - Strike
2010: Projeto Paralelo - NX Zero 
2010: Fake Number - Fake Number
2010: Manu Gavassi - Manu Gavassi 
2010: Revanche - Fresno 
2011: Multishow Ao Vivo: Nx Zero 10 anos - NX Zero 
2011: Rebeldes - Rebeldes
2011: Pelados em Santos - Mamonas Assassinas
2012: Julie e os Fantasmas - Cast of Julie e os Fantasmas 
2012: Rebeldes - Ao vivo - Rebeldes 
2012: Tudo de Novo - Negra Li 
2012: Meu Jeito, Seu Jeito - Rebeldes 
2013: Em Comum - NX Zero 
2013: Clichê Adolescente - Manu Gavassi 
2013: De Sol a Sol / Bora Viver - Planta & Raiz
2013: Girls - Girls 
2017: Maravilhosa - Ravena
2017: Kell Smith - Kell Smith

Filmography

References

External links

 

Living people
1969 births
Brazilian record producers
Latin music record producers
Brazilian guitarists
Rhythm guitarists
People from São Paulo